Kanta Dihal is a Dutch research scientist who works at the intersection of artificial intelligence, science communication, literature, and ethics. She is currently a senior research fellow at the University of Cambridge. Dihal is co-editor of the book AI Narratives: A History of Imaginative Thinking About Intelligent Machines.

Education 
Dihal received a Bachelor of Arts in English and Language Culture in 2011, a Bachelor of Arts in Film and Literary Studies in 2012, and a Masters of Arts in Literary Studies in 2014 from Leiden University. She completed her Ph.D. in Science Communication from the University of Oxford in 2018. Her thesis, advised by Sally Shuttleworth and Michael Whitworth, explored the communication of conflicting interpretations of quantum physics to adults and children. Dihal's Ph.D. research was cited in Australian Broadcasting Corporation's coverage of the BBC and HBO adaptation of Philip Pullman’s His Dark Materials.

Career and research 
Dihal's research intersects the fields of AI ethics, science communication, literature and science, and science fiction.

She is currently a senior research fellow at the Leverhulme Centre for the Future of Intelligence at the University of Cambridge. She leads two research projects there: Global AI Narratives and Decolonizing AI. The Global AI Narratives project explores the public understanding of AI as constructed by fictional and nonfictional narratives, spanning ancient classics like the Iliad all the way to modern films like Steven Spielberg's AI. With her colleagues, she is attempting to document the ways in which AI is understood and developed around the world and their consequences on diversity and equality. In her work for the Decolonizing AI project, Dihal examines how AI is portrayed in media, stock images, and dialect often with more "white" depictions and warns of the risk of creating a "homogeneous" workforce of technologists where people of colour are erased. She has co-authored a series of papers with Stephen Cave on "The Whiteness of AI".

Dihal has also advised the World Economic Forum, the UK House of Lords and the United Nations on the portrayals and perceptions of AI. She has given keynotes, lectures, and talks at academic conferences, institutions, tech conventions, science fiction conventions, corporate functions, literary festivals, and other public and private venues, including TEDxThessaloniki and CogX Festival. Her TEDx talk was on the topic “Is the Robot Rebellion Inevitable?”.

AI Narratives: A History of Imaginative Thinking About Intelligent Machines 
Dihal is co-editor of the book, AI Narratives: A History of Imaginative Thinking About Intelligent Machines, alongside Stephen Cave and Sarah Dillon. The book is a collection of essays examining how narrative representations of AI  have shaped technological development, understanding of humans, and the social and political orders that emerge from their relationships. The Times Literary Supplement remarked that this book is a “compelling collection shows how AI narratives have prompted critical reflection on human-machine relations”.

Selected awards 

 2020 Most Influential Women in UK Technology Award Nominee
 2021 100 Brilliant Women in AI Ethics Hall of Fame Honoree

References 

Living people
Year of birth missing (living people)
Alumni of the University of Oxford
Leiden University alumni
Academics of the University of Cambridge
People from Eindhoven